Ali Eisami Gazirmabe of Bornu (born 1786–1787), later known as William Harding, was a Kanuri man liberated from slavery by the British Royal Navy. Afterwards, he lived in Sierra Leone and worked with the German missionary Sigismund Koelle in creating a Kanuri grammar. In addition, Koelle recorded Eisami's stories of his life, composing a short memoir of his enslavement; Koelle refers to the Kanuri man as "Ali Eisami Gazirma", that is, Ali, whose mother was Eisa, from Gazir.

Eisami was taken as a captive from his home during warfare in Bornu and enslaved. After being sold years later at a coastal slave market, he and other captives were liberated at sea in 1817 by the Royal Navy, as the Atlantic slave trade had been banned. They were taken to the new colony of Sierra Leone in West Africa for resettlement, where he made a new home.

Biography
Ali Eisami was born in Gazir in the Kanem–Bornu Empire, in 1786 or 1787, among the Kanuri people (in the area of present-day Niger, Nigeria and Chad). His father was a mallam, a scholar, and Eisami was educated according to Islamic tradition. During the Fulani War, he witnessed the fall of Ngazargamu; his family lost their home and he was captured and enslaved. Taken with other slaves west through the Hausa Kingdoms, Eisami was held in Kano during the years of the Sokoto Caliphate and Katsina. He was a witness when Afonja rebelled in Oyo against the Oyo Empire and the Ilorin Emirate was founded.

In 1817 Eisami's Yoruba owner sold him to a slave market at the coast to prevent him from being liberated by Afonja, who had begun freeing slaves that year if they would join his army (this was the army that would enslave Samuel Ajayi Crowther at the capture of Crowther's hometown, Osogun, in 1821). In 1818 Eisami was taken on board by European slavers to sail for the New World, but the slave ship was intercepted by the British Royal Navy, who enforced the Blockade of Africa to abolish the Atlantic slave trade. The captives were liberated and taken to Sierra Leone, the British colony established in the late 18th century in West Africa for freed slaves.

In Sierra Leone, under governor Charles MacCarthy, thousands of liberated slaves were settled. The "Captured Negro Department" sent some as apprentices to the African-American settlers from North America, and some to previously liberated African individuals who had settled in Sierra Leone. Others were settled in specially designed villages, which were named for English counties or prominent people and run by Europeans; many of those belonged to and were operated by the Church Missionary Society of Britain. Initially subsidized by the government, the newly free people were expected to become self-sufficient. As they assimilated into the new community, they frequently took European names. Eisami took an English name, William Harding, as did many liberated slaves after him, such as Samuel Ajayi Crowther and Joseph Wright. He lived in Bathurst, the village run by the Church Missionary Society, and became a nominal Christian. (Ajayi Crowther settled here four years later after also being liberated by the British Navy.) 

The missionary and linguist Sigismund Koelle, who was working on a grammar of the Kanuri language, employed Eismai as an informant, that is, a person to help him learn and translate the language, as well as to explain culture. In addition, he recorded Eisami's memoir or slave narrative, titling it as "Ali Eisami Gazirmabe of Bornu", and published it in his African Native Literature (1854). Eisami described his enslavement as a result of the transatlantic slave trade in the same terms as other victims, as "the white man's barbaric cannibalism", in the words of historian William Dillon Piersen. Koelle left the mission and the country in 1853, and one scholar surmises that "his work with Ali Eisami ended in 1852" – and that the engraving for the frontispiece may have been based on a photograph, a very early photograph in a country where soon Krio people would enter that profession. The biography was included in Philip D. Curtin's 1967 anthology Africa remembered; narratives by West Africans from the era of the slave trade.

References

External links
S. W. Koelle, African Native Literature

1780s births
Former slaves
Kanuri people
People who wrote slave narratives
Sierra Leone Colony and Protectorate people
Year of death unknown
African slaves